The Christen Eagle, which later became the Aviat Eagle in the mid-1990s, is an aerobatic sporting biplane aircraft that has been produced in the United States since the late 1970s.

Design
Designed to compete with the Pitts Special by Frank Christensen originally of Salt Lake City, Utah, the Eagle II is marketed in kit form for homebuilding. The Eagle II is a small aircraft of conventional configuration with single-bay, equal-span staggered biplane wings braced with streamlined flying and landing wires and an I-strut to form a box truss. The pilot and a single passenger sit in tandem underneath a large bubble canopy. The tailwheel undercarriage is fixed, with the mainwheels mounted on spring aluminum legs. The main wheels are housed in streamlined fairings. The fuselage and tail are constructed of chromoly steel welded tube, with the forward fuselage skinned in aluminum and the rear fuselage and tail covered in fabric. The wing structure is Sitka spruce wood and fabric covered.  The engine cowling is fiberglass.  By 2011 over 350 aircraft were flying.

Operational history

In 1979, the Eagles Aerobatic Team (Charlie Hillard, Tom Poberezny, and Gene Soucy) chose the Christen Eagle as a replacement for their Pitts Special airshow act "The Red Devils". The act continued until 1995. All three Christen Eagles hang from the lobby of the EAA Airventure Museum in Oshkosh, Wisconsin.

Variants
Christen Eagle I Single seat variant. Lycoming AEIO-540 . First design model, built at the San Carlos Airport. Four airframes built, one is now based in Dallas Texas, the other 3 are in the EAA Museum in Oshkosh WI.

Christen/Aviat Eagle II Most common variant, two seat dual controls. Lycoming AEIO-360.
The first Eagle II produced (Serial #001) is on display at the Connecticut Air & Space Center in Stratford, CT.

Christen Super Eagle I 540 Two built. Lycoming AEIO-540 . Formerly flown by the Iron Eagles aerobatic team, now owned by Professional Pilots based in Texas and Alaska.

Christen Super Eagle II Several examples built, two seats, limited fuel tanks.

Specifications

See also

References

Manufacturer's website  
Cavanaugh Flight Museum's Christen Eagle II

1970s United States sport aircraft
Homebuilt aircraft
Biplanes
Single-engined tractor aircraft
Eagle II
Aerobatic aircraft
Aircraft first flown in 1977